Gamini may refer to
 Gamini Perera, Sri Lanka politician
Gamini Fonseka, Sri Lankan film actor
Gamini Dissanayake, Sri Lankan politician
Gaja Gamini, Indian actor
Gamini Wickremasinghe, Sri Lankan cricketer
Gamini Lokuge, Sri Lankan politician
Gamini Kularatne, Sri Lankan soldier
Gamini Goonesena, Sri Lankan cricketer
Gamini Silva, Sri Lankan cricketer
Gamini Perera, Sri Lankan cricketer
Gamini Haththotuwegama, Sri Lankan playwright, director and actor
Gamini Jayasuriya,  Sri Lankan politician
Gamini Hettiarachchi, Sri Lankan actor
Gamini Jayawickrama Perera, Sri Lankan politician
R. M. Gamini Rathnayake, Sri Lankan politician
Gamini Waleboda (born 1967), Sri Lankan politician
G. L. Peiris full name (Gamini Lakshman Peiris), Sri Lankan politician

Sinhalese masculine given names